John Junior Arwuah (born September 1, 1985 in Accra) is a Ghanaian footballer who plays as a midfielder.

Career
Arwuah came to South Africa in 2005 and was signed by Tembisa Classic and then signed for newly promoted team Durban Stars in June 2006, only for its franchise to be sold to Maritzburg United in 2008. On 29 June 2011 Arwuah left Maritzburg United F.C. and joined to South African Premier Soccer League rival SuperSport United F.C. In July 2012, Arwuah agreed to contract with Bloemfontein Celtic.

Position
Arwuah is a midfielder who can play defensive or central midfielder.

International career
He is former Ghana national under-17 football team player.

Personal life
He is the cousin of fellow Ghanaian footballer Samuel Darpoh.

References

1985 births
Living people
Ghanaian footballers
Footballers from Accra
Association football midfielders
Durban Stars F.C. players
Maritzburg United F.C. players
SuperSport United F.C. players
Bloemfontein Celtic F.C. players
AEL Limassol players
South African Premier Division players
Cypriot First Division players
Ghanaian expatriate footballers
Ghanaian expatriate sportspeople in South Africa
Ghanaian expatriate sportspeople in Malaysia
Ghanaian expatriate sportspeople in Cyprus
Expatriate soccer players in South Africa
Expatriate footballers in Malaysia
Expatriate footballers in Cyprus
Ghana youth international footballers